The Agglomeration community of Rouen is a former intercommunality located in the Seine-Maritime département in the Normandy region of northern France. It was created in January 2000. With three other intercommunalities it formed the Agglomeration community of Rouen-Elbeuf-Austreberthe in 2010, which was replaced by the Métropole Rouen Normandie in 2015.

Participants 
The Agglomeration community was composed of the following 45 communes:

Amfreville-la-Mi-Voie
Les Authieux-sur-le-Port-Saint-Ouen
Belbeuf
Bihorel
Bois-Guillaume
Bonsecours
Boos
La Bouille
Canteleu
Darnétal
Déville-lès-Rouen
Fontaine-sous-Préaux
Franqueville-Saint-Pierre
Gouy
Grand-Couronne
Le Grand-Quevilly
Hautot-sur-Seine
Le Houlme
Houppeville
Isneauville
Malaunay
Maromme
Le Mesnil-Esnard
Montmain
Mont-Saint-Aignan
Moulineaux
La Neuville-Chant-d'Oisel
Notre-Dame-de-Bondeville
Oissel
Petit-Couronne
Petit-Quevilly
Préaux
Quévreville-la-Poterie
Roncherolles-sur-le-Vivier
Rouen
Sahurs
Saint-Aubin-Celloville
Saint-Aubin-Épinay
Saint-Étienne-du-Rouvray
Saint-Jacques-sur-Darnétal
Saint-Léger-du-Bourg-Denis
Saint-Martin-du-Vivier
Saint-Pierre-de-Manneville
Sotteville-lès-Rouen
Val-de-la-Haye
Ymare

See also
Communes of the Seine-Maritime department

References 

Rouen